This is a list of missions conducted by Progress automated spacecraft. Progress is an uncrewed Russian (previously Soviet) cargo spacecraft which has been used since 1978 to deliver supplies to Soviet space stations Salyut 6, Salyut 7, Mir, and later to the International Space Station. All launches have occurred from the Baikonur Cosmodrome.

More than 150 flights have been launched, all except Progress M-12M, Progress M-27M and Progress MS-04/65P have reached their destinations, with no injuries or loss of life after launch; Progress M-12M and MS-04 failed during launch, whereas Progress M-27M experienced a spacecraft loss of attitude control while in orbit. The Progress M-24 spacecraft collided with Mir during a failed docking attempt in 1994, and Progress M-34 caused serious damage to the Spektr module when it drifted off course during a docking test in 1997.

The spacecraft uses the automatic Kurs docking system for rendezvous with its destination space station, where crew are used in supervisory roles, only intervening using the manual TORU system when problems occur. Five variants of the Progress spacecraft have been flown so far: Progress 7K-TG (1978–1990), Progress-M 11F615A55 (1989–2009), Progress-M1 (2000–2004), Progress-М 11F615A60 (2008–2015) and Progress-MS (since 2015). In addition, three custom Progress M variants were launched to deliver ISS modules Pirs in 2001, Poisk in 2009 and Prichal in late 2021.

Flights

Flights to Salyut 6 
All Progress spacecraft traveling to Salyut 6 were launched by the Soyuz-U, and dockings were to the rear port of the station. Progress 7 deployed the KRT-10 astronomy satellite.

Flights to Salyut 7 
Kosmos 1669 is the only Progress spacecraft to have received a Kosmos designation, which is usually reserved for the military, experimental and failed spacecraft.

Veteran enthusiast Robert Christy suggests this may have been an error due to confusion with a TKS spacecraft which later became Kosmos 1686. Astronautix.com suggests that the spacecraft may have gone out of control shortly after launch, but then been recovered after the Kosmos designation had been applied. Alternatively, it could have been given the designation as it was used to test modifications that would be used on future Progress missions. Some news agencies reported that it was a free-flying Progress-derived spacecraft, or that it was a new type of spacecraft derived from the Progress.

Flights to Mir 
The small capsule called Raduga was used for recovery of materials from the Mir station.

Flights to ISS 
Currently, resupply missions often use the Russian Progress spacecraft. As of 2020, Progress spacecraft have flown most of the uncrewed missions to the ISS.

Missions

Current spaceflights
This is a list of current spaceflights to the International Space Station.

Future spaceflights
Scheduled future flights as of September 2021.

Italics number entries are from secondary sources (Progress MS schedule), not on main launch manifests.

See also

 List of Soviet human spaceflight missions, with all Soviet Vostok, Voskhod, and Soyuz missions
 List of Russian human spaceflight missions, with all Russian Soyuz missions
 List of human spaceflights to Mir
 List of uncrewed spaceflights to Mir
 List of human spaceflights to the International Space Station
 Uncrewed spaceflights to the International Space Station

References

External links
 Russian Launch Manifest dated 23 July 2014

Progress
Progress